Santa Rosa International Airport  (also known as Coronel Artilleria Victor Larrea Airport) is an airport serving Machala, the capital of El Oro Province in Ecuador. It was built by the Ecuadorean Army Corps of Engineers under the direction of Ecuador's Directorate General of Civil Aviation. This great scale engineering project was led by Maj. Eng. Henry Miranda and Maj. Eng. J.C. Checa.

Airlines and destinations

See also
Transport in Ecuador
List of airports in Ecuador

References

External links
OpenStreetMap - Santa Rosa
OurAirports - Santa Rosa
SkyVector - Santa Rosa Airport
FallingRain - Santa Rosa Airport

Airports in Ecuador
Buildings and structures in El Oro Province
Machala